KDE may refer to:

 KDE, an international free software community
KDE Projects
 KDE Software Compilation
KDE e.V., the German foundation behind KDE
KDE Plasma (disambiguation), graphical environments provided by KDE
 Kentucky Department of Education
 4Kids Entertainment, NYSE stock ticker symbol
 Kernel density estimation
 Makonde language (ISO 639-3: kde)